Elections to Derry City Council were held on 21 May 1997 on the same day as the other Northern Irish local government elections. The election used five district electoral areas to elect a total of 30 councillors.

Election results

Note: "Votes" are the first preference votes.

Districts summary

|- class="unsortable" align="centre"
!rowspan=2 align="left"|Ward
! % 
!Cllrs
! % 
!Cllrs
! %
!Cllrs
! %
!Cllrs
! % 
!Cllrs
!rowspan=2|TotalCllrs
|- class="unsortable" align="center"
!colspan=2 bgcolor="" | SDLP
!colspan=2 bgcolor="" | Sinn Féin
!colspan=2 bgcolor="" | DUP
!colspan=2 bgcolor="" | UUP
!colspan=2 bgcolor="white"| Others
|-
|align="left"|Cityside
|40.6
|2
|bgcolor="#008800"|55.5
|bgcolor="#008800"|3
|0.0
|0
|0.0
|0
|3.9
|0
|5
|-
|align="left"|Northland
|bgcolor="#99FF66"|57.2
|bgcolor="#99FF66"|5
|33.4
|2
|0.0
|0
|0.0
|0
|9.4
|0
|7
|-
|align="left"|Rural
|bgcolor="#99FF66"|44.5
|bgcolor="#99FF66"|3
|9.0
|0
|23.6
|1
|20.0
|1
|2.9
|0
|6
|-
|align="left"|Shantallow
|bgcolor="#99FF66"|56.4
|bgcolor="#99FF66"|3
|36.7
|2
|1.7
|0
|0.0
|0
|5.2
|0
|5
|-
|align="left"|Waterside
|19.8
|1
|9.9
|1
|bgcolor="#D46A4C"|35.0
|bgcolor="#D46A4C"|3
|22.2
|1
|13.1
|1
|7
|-
|- class="unsortable" class="sortbottom" style="background:#C9C9C9"
|align="left"| Total
|43.7
|14
|27.7
|8
|12.6
|4
|8.7
|3
|7.3
|1
|30
|-
|}

District results

Cityside

1993: 3 x SDLP, 2 x Sinn Féin
1997: 3 x Sinn Féin, 2 x SDLP
1993-1997 Change: Sinn Féin gain from SDLP

Northland

1993: 5 x SDLP, 2 x Sinn Féin
1997: 5 x SDLP, 2 x Sinn Féin
1993-1997 Change: No change

Rural

1993: 3 x SDLP, 2 x DUP, 1 x UUP
1997: 3 x SDLP, 2 x UUP, 1 x DUP
1993-1997 Change: UUP gain from DUP

Shantallow

1993: 4 x SDLP, 1 x Sinn Féin
1997: 3 x SDLP, 2 x Sinn Féin
1993-1997 Change: Sinn Féin gain from SDLP

Waterside

1993: 3 x DUP, 2 x SDLP, 1 x UUP, 1 x Independent Unionist
1997: 3 x DUP, 1 x SDLP, 1 x UUP, 1 x Sinn Féin, 1 x Independent Unionist
1993-1997 Change: Sinn Féin gain from SDLP

References

Derry City Council elections
Derry